Brigadier John Macready (1887–27 February 1957) was a British Army officer who served with the Bedfordshire Regiment in Europe in World War I and in India. His father was Jonathan F. Macready, a son of the celebrated Victorian actor-theatre  manager W.C.Macready.

Military career 
Macready was born in London West Queen Anne St. He trained at the Royal Military College and was appointed Second lieutenant in the Bedfordshire Regiment  (later the Bedfordshire and Hertfordshire Regiment) in 1907. In the 1911 Census, his rank was Lieutenant. In 1913 he was promoted from Adjutant to Captain in the Bedfordshire Regiment. In 1916 he was awarded the D.S.O. and the Chevalier de l’Ordre de Leopold. In 1917, he was awarded the Croix de Guerre. From 1933-1937 he was Commanding Officer 2nd Battalion. Bedfordshire and Hertfordshire Regiment. In 1937 he was appointed Assistant Commandant of Hythe Wing, Small Arms School. From 1939-1940 he was Commanding Officer of 162nd (East Midland) Brigade.

Family 
Brig. Gen. Macready  married Marguerite Mary Milling (1890-1982). They had two children: Daphne Lois Macready (better known as the writer Rowena Farre) and Anthony John Lowne Macready.

He died in Folkestone, Kent, in 1957.

Notes

References

External links 
 Ancestry,com: Brig. Gen. Macready. http://records.ancestry.com/Brig_Gen_Macready_records.ashx?pid=21701458
Generals of World War II

1887 births
1957 deaths
Bedfordshire and Hertfordshire Regiment officers
British Army personnel of World War I
Military personnel from London
British Army brigadiers of World War II
Graduates of the Royal Military College, Sandhurst

Companions of the Distinguished Service Order

Recipients of the Croix de Guerre 1914–1918 (France)